The Volvo 66 sprang directly from the DAF 66, which was originally styled by Giovanni Michelotti. The compact car was introduced in August 1975, almost exactly a year after Volvo bought DAF, and before production of the Volvo 300 Series began.

The Volvo 66 was known for its continuously variable transmission, the Variomatic. The Volvo version of the car was slightly restyled and given larger bumpers compared with those of the original DAF model. Although this was in keeping with Volvo's emphasis on safety, it also increased its cost of production.

The Volvo 66 was available as a two-door saloon and three-door estate, whilst the two-door DAF 66 Coupé was dropped, and therefore was never sold as a Volvo.

The other major features in which the Volvo 66 differs from the DAF 66 are also mostly safety related. It has different seats featuring headrests, a safety steering wheel, steel side-impact bars in the doors, a declutching servo which enabled the driver to change gear with the choke engaged (In the older DAF models this was not possible, because the increased idle caused the centrifugal clutch to engage). The Volvo 66 also has a 'park' mode in the CVT, which locks the driveline. From 1977 the estate version featured a window wiper on the bootlid.

Number produced 

Volvo produced roughly 106,000 units of both the saloon and estate 66, and no more than 14,000 were sold in the United Kingdom. The majority were sold in continental Europe rather than in Sweden, where the car was never accepted by Volvo buyers.

Engines 
 B110 Renault C-series OHV 1108 cc inline-four, 
 B130 Renault C-series OHV 1289 cc inline-four,

Gallery

References 

66
Cars of the Netherlands
Vehicles with CVT transmission
Rear-wheel-drive vehicles
Cars introduced in 1975
1980s cars
VDL Nedcar vehicles
Station wagons